Dowerin is a town  north-east of Perth in the central Wheatbelt region of Western Australia. It is the seat of the Shire of Dowerin.

History
In 1906 the government extended the railway from Goomalling to the developing Dowerin Agricultural Area and decided to develop a townsite at the terminus. The Aboriginal name of the site chosen was "Wuguni", but "Dowerin", also an Aboriginal name, was already in local use for the place, and was the name gazetted in 1907. The name is derived from nearby Lake Dowerin, first recorded on maps around 1879. One source suggests dowerin is the Aboriginal word for the twenty-eight parrot (dow-arn), and another suggests it means "place of the throwing stick" (dower).

In 1932 the Wheat Pool of Western Australia announced that the town would have two grain elevators, each fitted with an engine, installed at the railway siding.

Field day
Dowerin is home to the Dowerin GWN7 Machinery Field Day, a two-day annual event (held in the last week of August) showcasing agricultural and associated equipment, as well as providing information and services to people from rural areas. The field day attracts on average in excess of 600 exhibitors as well as over 15,000 local and national visitors each day.

The event was first held as the Dowerin Machinery Field Day on 3 September 1965, and was the result of meetings by the Dowerin Progress Association the previous year that looked at ideas to prevent the town of Dowerin from becoming a ghost town. Some twenty exhibitors and two thousand visitors attended the first field day, with funds raised from the first event going towards funding the construction of a dam and a grassed tennis court. The event continues to be run and managed by the local community, with three full-time staff and 400 volunteers involved in the event's running each year.

Since 1992, regional television broadcaster Golden West Network has been the event's naming rights sponsor.

Theo's run
Between 1927 and 1939, the town hosted one of the major racetracks in the state.  The Second World War brought an end to the racing and when it started again afterwards, racers moved to a new track on the former Caversham Airfield near Perth.  Later, they moved from Caversham to Wanneroo; the track is today known as Barbagallo Raceway.

In May 2007, a vintage car motoring event was run to commemorate the town's history and its association with motor racing in Western Australia.  Known as Theo's run, the event is named after a local who raced on the Dowerin track in its heyday in the 1930s and is expected to become an annual event.  The 2007 event included a vintage car run from Perth with Jaguar and Riley cars participating.

Facilities

Dowerin District High School caters for students up to the level of Year 10. Past this, students wishing to further their education must attend Northam Senior High School, a 40-minute drive away. The school has a performing arts centre, and a library with a seminar area.
The surrounding areas produce wheat and other cereal crops. The town is a receival site for Cooperative Bulk Handling.

Notable people
 Mal Brown –  Australian rules football player, WAFL Sandover Medal winner
 Murray Couper – champion WAFL football player, Bernie Naylor Medal winner for leading goal kicker, Prendergast Medal winner
 Lance Franklin – Coleman Medal winner and premiership player for Hawthorn Football Club in 2008 and 2013
 Bianca Giteau (Franklin) – Adelaide Thunderbirds netball player
 Tom Lee – emerging talent for the St Kilda Football Club
 Don Maisey (1915–2005) – federal politician, a founder of WA Farmer's Union

References

External links
Dowerin GWN Machinery Field Days website

Towns in Western Australia
Grain receival points of Western Australia
Shire of Dowerin